"We Can Freak It" is a song by American hip hop recording artist Kurupt, featuring vocals from American singers Baby S and Butch Cassidy. It was released as the single of his debut studio album Kuruption!, with the record labels Antra Records and A&M Records. The song was produced by Battlecat.

Track listing 
CD single
We Can Freak It (Clean Radio Edit) — 4:00
We Can Freak It (Bud'da Clean Radio Remix) (Remix Bud'da) — 4:00
We Can Freak It (LP Instrumental) — 4:19
We Can Freak It (Bud'da Remix Instrumental) (Remix Bud'da) — 4:20
We Can Freak It (Acappella) — 4:20

Charts

Weekly charts

References

1998 singles
Songs written by Kurupt
1998 songs
Songs written by Battlecat (record producer)
A&M Records singles
Song recordings produced by Battlecat (record producer)